Acrobasis foroiuliensis is a species of snout moth in the genus Acrobasis. It was described by Peter Huemer and Matthias Nuss in 2007. It is found in Italy.

References

Moths described in 2007
Acrobasis
Endemic fauna of Italy
Moths of Europe